The Indian Registry for Internet Names and Numbers (IRINN) is the National Internet Registry in India. IRINN is entrusted with the task of coordinating IP address allocation with other Internet resource management function at national level in the country.  National Internet Registry for India (IRINN) was announced on 2 March 2012.

IRINN is a non-profit, affiliation-based organisation functioning under NIXI and performing research, education and enlightenment activities.

NIR is entrusted with the task of:
 Coordinating and allocating Internet Protocol addresses – IPV4 & IPV6
 Autonomous System (AS Numbers)

References

External links
 IRINN website

Internet in India
Ministry of Communications and Information Technology (India)
IPv6